John Guy McDowell (February 25, 1794 in Chemung, then in Tioga County, New York – January 1, 1866 in Chemung, now in Chemung County, New York) was an American politician from New York.

Life
He was the son of Daniel McDowell (1763–1806) and Ruth (Drake) McDowell (1766–1854). He fought in the War of 1812 as a lieutenant. On December 21, 1815, he married Laurinda Lowman (1793–1859), and they had nine children.

He was a member of the New York State Assembly (Tioga Co.) in 1830 and 1831. At the same time, he was Postmaster of Chemung.

He was a member of the New York State Senate (6th D.) from 1832 to 1835, sitting in the 55th, 56th, 57th and 58th New York State Legislatures.

He was Postmaster of West Chemung (now Lowman, a hamlet in the Town of Chemung) from 1840 to 1842.

He secured the charter for, and was the first President of, the Chemung Canal Bank. He was also an associate judge of the Tioga County Court for some time.

He was buried at the Riverside Cemetery in Chemung.

Sources
The New York Civil List compiled by Franklin Benjamin Hough (pages 129f, 143, 210f and 289; Weed, Parsons and Co., 1858)
Table of the Post Offices in the United States (1831; pg. 72)
Our County and Its People: A History of the Valley and County of Chemung by Ausburn Towner (1892; pg. 518)

External links

1794 births
1866 deaths
New York (state) state senators
Members of the New York State Assembly
New York (state) Jacksonians
19th-century American politicians
New York (state) postmasters
American bankers
New York (state) state court judges
People from Chemung, New York